Henry Todd may refer to:
 Henry Alfred Todd (1854–1925), American Romance philologist
 Henry Todd (priest) (1763–1845), English clergyman, librarian, and scholar
 Henry D. Todd (1838–1907), U.S. Naval Academy professor
 Henry D. Todd Jr. (1866–1964), U.S. Army general
 Henry George Todd (1847–1898), English artist